The Ministry of Gender, Labour and Social Development (MGLSD) is a Cabinet-level government ministry of Uganda. The mandate of the ministry is to empower citizens to maximize their individual and collective potential by developing skills, increasing labour productivity, and cultural enrichment to achieve sustainable and gender-sensitive development. The ministry is headed by a Cabinet minister, Betty Amongi Akena.

Location
The headquarters of the MGLSD are on George Street on  Nakasero Hill in the Central Division of Kampala, the capital and largest city of Uganda. The coordinates of the ministry headquarters are 0°19'00.0"N, 32°34'43.0"E (Latitude:0.316677; Longitude:32.578611).

Directorates
MGLSD is divided into the following administrative directorates:
 Labour, Employment and Occupational Safety
 Social Protection
 Gender & Community Development

Leadership
The cabinet minister is assisted by five ministers of state.
 State Minister for Gender and Culture - Peace Mutuuzo
 State Minister for Youth and Children Affairs - Hon. Nyirabashitsi Sarah Mateke
 State Minister for the Elderly - Hon. Dominic Mafwabi Gidudu
 State Minister for Disability Affairs - Hon. Asamo Hellen Grace
 State Minister for Labour, Employment and Industrial Relations - Col. Rtd Okello P. Charles Engola

List of ministers

Minister of Gender, Labour and Social Development
 Betty Amongi (8 June 2021 - present)
Frank Tumwebaze (14 December 2019 - 8 June 2021)
Janat Mukwaya (6 June 2016 - 14 December 2019)

Minister of Gender and Social Issues
 Wilson Muruli Mukasa (1 March 2015 - 6 June 2016)
 Mary Karooro Okurut (23 May 2013 - 1 March 2015)
 Syda Bbumba (27 May 2011 - 16 February 2012)

Minister of Gender, Labour and Social Development
 Gabriel Opio (16 February 2009 - 27 May 2011)
 Syda Bbumba (1 June 2006 - 16 February 2009)
 Zoe Bakoko Bakoru (2001 - 1 June 2006)

See also
Politics of Uganda
Parliament of Uganda

References

External links
 Website of Ugandan Ministry of Gender, Labour and Social Development

Gender, Labour and Social Development
Uganda
Social affairs ministries
Uganda
Uganda
Organisations based in Kampala
Women's rights in Uganda